Quintana del Pidio is a municipality and town located in the province of Burgos, Castile and León, Spain. According to the 2004 census (INE), the municipality has a population of 180 inhabitants.

Economy 

The core business of the locality is fundamentally agricultural, particularly wine growing, with important wineries, grain and livestock, especially ovine. It has the following 8 wineries:

 Bodegas Casajús.
 Cillar de Silos
 Cooperativa Nuestra Señora de los Olmos
 Pagos de Quintana
 Marqués de Valparaíso
 Valle de Monzón
 Prado de Olmedo
 Alto Miraltares

People from Quintana del Pidio 
 Ciriaco María Sancha y Hervás (1833–1909) - Cardinal of the Roman Catholic Church, who served as Archbishop of Toledo, Primate of Spain and Patriarch of the West Indies.

References

Municipalities in the Province of Burgos